Ecolog Arena is a multi-purpose stadium in Tetovo, North Macedonia used primary for football matches. The stadium's capacity is 15,000 seats.

History
The stadium opened in 1981 and was called Tetovo City Stadium (Stadion Gradski Tetovo) until 2016.

The Football Federation of Macedonia and the Tetovo Municipality agreed in March 2015 to renovate the stadium as a part of the UEFA "Hat-trick 4" initiative. The renovation began in April 2015 and was completed in April 2016. Floodlights to play matches at night were erected later the same year.

In July 2016, Ecolog International, the owners of KF Shkëndija, took Tetovo City Stadium under concession from the Tetovo municipal council and committed to invest 7.7 million euros to renovate the stadium to be able to host international matches. The ground was renamed Ecolog Arena under the concession agreement.

International fixtures

References

External links
Gradski Stadion – Tetovo
Macedonian Football 
Football Federation of Macedonia 

Football venues in North Macedonia
Stadium
KF Renova
FK Teteks
Multi-purpose stadiums in North Macedonia
Sport in Tetovo